Abel Alonso Sopelana (born 1935) is a Spanish-Chilean entrepreneur, shoemaker and former leader of the Chilean football who served as president of the Asociación Nacional de Fútbol Profesional (ANFP) and Unión Española. He was born in Spain, but his family exiled with him from Francisco Franco’s dictatorship.

Alonso twice reached the presidency of the ANFP. In his first period, the Chilean football team qualified to the 1982 FIFA World Cup in Spain, and during its presidency, Chile held the 1991 Copa América.

Biography
Born in Bilbao, his father –a communist mayor– was a prisoner for seven years under Franco's dictatorship. After his release from prison, his family escaped the country, and in 1951 they settled in Santiago de Chile, dedicating themselves to the manufacture of shoes, arriving to turn its workshop into one of the most important shoe factories in Chile.

Simultaneously, he joined the football club Unión Española, becoming president of it. Under his successful management, the team won the 1973, 1975 and 1977 Primera División de Chile tournaments. Similarly, under Alonso, Unión was runner-up in the 1975 Copa Libertadores.

References

Notes

Further reading

External links
 List of ANFP presidents in Radio Cooperativa

1935 births
Spanish businesspeople
Presidents of the ANFP
Unión Española chairmen and investors
Living people